Yuny may refer to:
Yuny or Iuny, an ancient Egyptian official
Yuny (viceroy of Kush), or Iuny, an ancient Egyptian official
Yuny Han (born 1983), Korean actress
Yuny railway station of the October Railway in St. Petersburg, Russia
Yuny Strait, a sound in Severnaya Zemlya, Russia

See also
Yuni (disambiguation)